Route 3 is a  route connecting Middletown to the Glastonbury-East Hartford town line. It passes through the towns of Cromwell, Rocky Hill, Wethersfield, and Glastonbury. The northernmost  of Route 3 is an expressway that was originally intended for the cancelled Interstate 491.

Route description

Route 3 begins at Route 66 in Middletown, and is a secondary, minor arterial road for its first  up to its interchange with Interstate 91 in Wethersfield. After crossing into Cromwell, it intersects Route 372, which offers access to Route 9 just east of the intersection.  After overpassing Route 9, it continues north into Rocky Hill and overpasses Interstate 91 without an interchange (access is via West Street [SSR 411]).  After a brief concurrency with Route 160, it crosses into Wethersfield, where it meets the eastern end of Route 287 and crosses over Route 99.  After the Silas Deane Highway (Route 99) intersection, it becomes a freeway for the last .  After a partial interchange with Interstate 91 (no direct access to I-91 South from Route 3 North), it crosses the Connecticut River on the William H. Putnam Memorial Bridge into Glastonbury. The freeway has one exit for Main Street (via Glastonbury Boulevard northbound and Putnam Boulevard southbound) before ending at a trumpet interchange with the Route 2 freeway at the East Hartford town line. The last  of Route 3 is the merging ramp from Route 3 northbound to Route 2 westbound.

History

1941
Route 3 was established in 1941. It originally ran from West Street/Berlin Road in Cromwell, which was part of Route 72 at the time (now Route 372), to the Silas Deane Highway (Route 99) in Wethersfield.

1958-1973 (I-491)

In late 1958, as part of the planned Interstate 491 (a southeastern bypass of Hartford), a freeway from I-91 to Main Street in Glastonbury, crossing the Connecticut River on the Putnam Memorial Bridge, was opened. The Route 3 designation was temporarily extended along this freeway pending completion of I-491. In 1973, I-491 was cancelled due to local opposition and the Route 3 designation along this freeway segment became permanent.  In the late 1980s, the freeway was extended so that it terminated at Route 2, rather than at Main Street.

1991

In 1991, when the Route 9 freeway through Berlin and New Britain was completed, Route 72 was truncated to end at Route 9 in New Britain. The east–west portion of the old alignment of Route 72 was reassigned to an extended Route 372 (running along Berlin Road/West Street to end at Route 99 in Cromwell). The north–south portion of old Route 72 from Cromwell to Middletown (ending at Route 66) was reassigned to Route 3.

Major intersections
As part of an upcoming sign replacement project on CT Route 3 between I-91 and CT Route 2, new mile-based exit numbers will be added along that stretch of freeway.

References

Connecticut State Highway Log (2006)
kurumi.com - Route 3
kurumi.com - I-491

External links

003
Transportation in Hartford County, Connecticut
Transportation in Middlesex County, Connecticut
Middletown, Connecticut
Cromwell, Connecticut
Rocky Hill, Connecticut
Wethersfield, Connecticut
Glastonbury, Connecticut